The fourth government of Miguel Sanz was formed on 17 August 2007, following the latter's election as President of the Government of Navarre by the Parliament of Navarre on 11 August and his swearing-in on 16 August, as a result of Navarrese People's Union (UPN) emerging as the largest parliamentary force at the 2007 Navarrese regional election and forming an alliance together with the Convergence of Democrats of Navarre (CDN).

Until 2009, the cabinet comprised members of UPN and CDN, as well as a number of independents proposed by the former party. On 28 September 2009, Sanz expelled the two CDN members from the cabinet—effective from 1 October—over discrepancies between the two parties in relation with a reform of the Basque language law.

Investiture

Cabinet changes
Sanz's fourth government saw a number of cabinet changes during its tenure:
On 28 September 2009, Miguel Sanz announced the dismissal of the two CDN ministers from the government, over discrepancies between the two parties in relation with a reform of the Basque language law. This was effective from 1 October, when Alberto Catalán (Institutional Relations and Spokesperson of the Government) and Amelia Salanueva (Local Administration) assumed the portfolios of Education and of Housing and Territory Planning, respectively.

From 23 May 2011, Sanz's cabinet took on acting duties for the duration of the government formation process resulting from the 2011 regional election. A number of ministers renounced their posts throughout this period, with the ordinary discharge of duties of their ministries being transferred to other cabinet members as a result of Sanz being unable to appoint replacements while in acting role.
On 11 June 2011, Begoña Sanzberro stepped down from the Rural Development and Environment portfolio in order to assume the post of local councillor in Baztán, due to both offices being incompatible. Javier Caballero, acting First Vice President and Minister of the Presidency, Justice and Interior, was temporarily entrusted with the office's portfolio.
On 15 June 2011, Alberto Catalán stepped down from all his government posts in order to become new president of the Parliament of Navarre, due to both offices being incompatible. Javier Caballero was temporarily entrusted with the office's portfolio.

Council of Government
The Council of Government was structured into the offices for the president, the two vice presidents and 12 ministries.

Notes

References

2007 establishments in Navarre
2011 disestablishments in Navarre
Cabinets established in 2007
Cabinets disestablished in 2011
Cabinets of Navarre